Rachel Parsons may refer to:

 Rachel Mary Parsons (1885–1956), British engineer
 Rachel Parsons (figure skater) (born 1997), American ice dancer